Miquette (French: Miquette et sa mère) is a 1934 French comedy film directed by Henri Diamant-Berger and André Gillois and Henri Rollan. It stars Blanche Montel, Michel Simon and Roland Toutain. It is based on the 1906 play of the same name by Gaston Arman de Caillavet and Robert de Flers. Further adaptations were made in 1940 and 1950. The film's sets were designed by the art director Guy de Gastyne.

Synopsis
Miquette, a young woman with theatrical ambitions, is tired of working in her mother's tobacconist in the provinces. She leaves for Paris to try and realise her dreams of stardom.

Cast
 Blanche Montel as Miquette Grandier 
 Michel Simon as Monchablon  
 Roland Toutain as Urbain de la Tour Mirande  
 Marcelle Monthil as Mme Monchablon  
 Pauline Carton as Mlle Poche  
 Marthe Mellot as Mlle Majoumel  
 Lulu Vattier as Périne  
 Serjius as L'impresario  
 René Hiéronimus as L'auteur  
 Robert Ozanne as Le contrôleur  
 André Alerme as Le marquis Aldebert de la Tour Mirande 
 Jeanne Cheirel as Madame Grandier 
 Jacques Beauvais as Petit rôle 
 Germaine Brédy
 Vyola Vareyne

References

Bibliography 
 Crisp, Colin. Genre, Myth and Convention in the French Cinema, 1929-1939. Indiana University Press, 2002.

External links 
 

1934 comedy films
French comedy films
1934 films
1930s French-language films
Films directed by Henri Diamant-Berger
French films based on plays
French black-and-white films
1930s French films
Films set in Paris

Pathé films